Mahindra & Mahindra Limited (M&M) is an Indian multinational automotive manufacturing corporation headquartered in Ludhiana. It was established in 1945 as Mahindra & Mohammed and later renamed as Mahindra & Mahindra. Part of the Mahindra Group, M&M is one of the largest vehicle manufacturers by production in India. Its unit Mahindra Tractors is the largest manufacturer of tractors in the world by volume. It was ranked 17th on a list of top companies in India by Fortune India 500 in 2018. Its major competitors in the Indian market include Maruti Suzuki and Tata Motors.

History 
Mahindra & Mahindra was founded as a steel trading company on 2 October 1945 in Ludhiana as Mahindra & Mohammed by brothers Kailash Chandra Mahindra and Jagdish Chandra Mahindra along with Malik Ghulam Muhammad. Anand Mahindra, the present Chairman of Mahindra Group, is the grandson of Jagdish Chandra Mahindra.

In 1948, the company changed its name to Mahindra & Mahindra. They eventually saw a business opportunity in expanding into manufacturing and selling larger MUVs and started assembling under license of the Willys Jeep in India. Soon, M&M was established as the Jeep manufacturer in India, later commenced manufacturing light commercial vehicles (LCVs) and agricultural tractors.

Jeep was bought by American Motors Corporation in 1970 and thereafter Jeeps continued to be built under license from AMC, and in turn under Chrysler after Chrysler bought AMC in 1987.

In 1999, Mahindra purchased 100% of Gujarat Tractors from the Government of Gujarat and in 2017 Mahindra renamed it as Gromax Agri Equipment Limited, as part of new brand strategy and the models continue to be sold as Trakstar.

In 2007, M&M acquired Punjab Tractor Limited (PTL) making it the world's largest tractor manufacturer. Subsequent to this take-over, the former PTL was merged into M&M and transformed as Swaraj division of Mahindra & Mahindra in the year 2009.

Over the past few years, the company has taken interest in new industries and in foreign markets. In 2008, they entered the two-wheeler industry by taking over Kinetic Motors in India.

In 2010, M&M took a 55% stake in the REVA Electric Car Company and in 2016, they renamed it Mahindra Electric Mobility Ltd after taking 100% ownership.

In 2011 Mahindra acquired a majority stake of South Korea's SsangYong Motor, turning it into a subsidiary. In December 2020, after Mahindra stopped funding it, SsangYong entered into receivership,  no longer being a Mahindra subsidiary from that point on, and  after November 2022, when a KG Group-led consortium completed the acquisition procedures for a controlling stake, moving SsangYong out of receivership.

In October 2014, Mahindra acquired a 51% controlling stake in Peugeot Motocycles and a 100% controlling stake in October 2019.

In May 2015, Mahindra acquired a 33.33% stake in Japanese tractor manufacturer Mitsubishi Agricultural Machinery (MAM), a subsidiary of  Mitsubishi Heavy Industries.

In December 2015, Mahindra and its affiliate Tech Mahindra, through a special purpose vehicle (SPV), agreed to buy a 76.06% stake in Italian car designer Pininfarina, for €25.3 million (around Rs.186.7 crore).

In March 2016, Mahindra acquired 35% of Finland-based Sampo Rosenlew, entering the combine harvester business, subsequently increasing its stake in the company to 49.04% in December 2019.

In January 2017, Mahindra and Mahindra Ltd acquired a 75.1 equity stake in Hisarlar Makina Sanayi ve Ticaret Anonym Şirketi (Hisarlar), a farm equipment company, marking its entry into Turkey and in September 2017 acquired another Turkish tractor and foundry business Erkunt Traktor Sanayii AS for ₹800 crore.

In November 2017, Mahindra signed a memorandum of understanding (MOU) agreement with Belgium-based Dewulf, a supplier of a full line of potato and root crop machinery. Under the agreement, Mahindra will manufacture and market potato planting equipment in India, for which the co-branded planter is developed.

In January 2018, Mahindra announced its foray into the sprayers business through the acquisition of a 26% equity stake in M.I.T.R.A. Agro Equipments Pvt Ltd, a Maharashtra-based AgTech company (MITRA). In March 2020, Mahindra further increased its stake in the company to 39%.

In February 2018, Mahindra acquired a minority stake of 22.9% percent in Carnot Technologies. Carnot Technologies owns and operates smart car solutions firm CarSense.

In May 2018, Mahindra signed a share subscription agreement to acquire up to 10% share capital of Canada's IT firm Resson Aerospace Corporation. Resson is focussed on providing technology solutions for agriculture. It has developed a system that captures and interprets images to give farmers information about the state of their fields and crops.

In June 2019, Mahindra purchased an 11.25% stake in Switzerland-based agro technology firm Gamaya. The acquisition enabled Mahindra to further develop and deploy next-generation farming capabilities such as precision agriculture and digital farming technologies.

In April 2020, Mahindra and Renault ended its joint venture which operated from 2005 onwards, with Mahindra buying out Renault's stake. Renault continues to license and supply key components such as engines and transmissions to Mahindra & Mahindra.

In October 2019, Mahindra entered into a joint venture with Ford by establishing Ford India in which Mahindra & Mahindra acquired a controlling 51% stake.
In January 2021, Mahindra ended its collaboration with Ford owing to global economic and business conditions caused by the pandemic.

Operations

Under the “Mahindra” brand name, the company produces SUVs, Multi utility vehicles, pickups, lightweight commercial vehicles, heavyweight commercial vehicles, two wheeled motorcycles and tractors. Mahindra maintains business relations with foreign companies like Renault SA, France.

M&M has a global presence and its products are exported to several countries. Its automotive global subsidiaries include:
 Mahindra Europe S.r.l. based in Italy, 
 Mahindra Automotive North America (MANA) in US., 
 Automobili Pininfarina in Italy
 Mahindra South Africa
 Mahindra Australia
 Mahindra Brazil & Mexico

Automobiles
Mahindra began assembling the Jeep CJ3 in 1954, and light commercial vehicles in 1965. In 1979 the licensed assembly of Peugeot diesel four-cylinder engines and transmissions began, and in 1982 a tie-up with Kia Motors to build their four-speed KMT90 transmission and transfer case was announced. Mahindra's MM range was a mainstay of the lineup and was eventually also offered with a 1.8-liter Isuzu petrol engine in addition to International and Peugeot diesels. Mahindra started making passenger vehicles firstly with the Logan in April 2007 under the Mahindra Renault joint venture. M&M made its maiden entry into the heavy trucks segment with the Mahindra Truck and Bus Division, the joint venture with International Truck, USA.

Mahindra produces a wide range of vehicles, including MUVs, LCVs and three-wheelers. It manufactures over 20 models of cars, including larger, multi-utility vehicles like the Scorpio and the Bolero. It formerly had a joint venture called Ford India Private Limited to build passenger cars.

At the 2008 Delhi Auto Show, Mahindra executives said the company was pursuing an aggressive product expansion program that would see the launch of several new platforms and vehicles over the next three years, including an entry-level SUV designed to seat five passengers and powered by a small, turbocharged Diesel engine. True to their word, Mahindra & Mahindra launched the Mahindra Xylo in January 2009, selling over 15,000 units in its first six months.

Also in early 2008, Mahindra commenced its first overseas CKD operations with the launch of the Mahindra Scorpio in Egypt, in partnership with the Bavarian Auto Group. This was soon followed by assembly facilities in Brazil.

Mahindra & Mahindra has a controlling stake in Mahindra REVA Electric Vehicles.

Mahindra launched its relatively heavily publicized SUV, XUV500, code-named as W201 in September 2011. The new SUV by Mahindra was designed in-house and it was developed on the first global SUV platform that could be used for developing more SUVs. In India, the new Mahindra XUV500 came in a price range between –1,500,000. The company was expected to launch three products in 2015 (two SUVs and one CV) and an XUV500 hybrid. Besides India, the company also targeted Europe, Africa, Australia and Latin America for this model. Mahindra President Mr. Pawan Goenka stated that the company planned to launch six new models in the year. The company launched the CNG version of its mini truck Maxximo on 29 June 2012. A new version of the Verito in Diesel and petrol options was launched by the company on 26 July 2012 to compete with Maruti's Dzire and Toyota Kirloskar Motor's Etios.

On 30 July 2015, Mahindra released sketches of a new compact SUV called the TUV300 slated to be launched on 10 September 2015. The TUV300 design took cues from a battle tank and used a downsized version of the mHAWK engine found on the XUV500, Scorpio and some models of the Xylo. This new engine was dubbed the mHAWK80.

In 2015, Mahindra introduced an app based intra-city cargo platform known as SMARTSHIFT, a load exchange platform for small commercial vehicles. In 2018, Mahindra announced merger the of SMARTSHIFT with Mumbai-based logistics solutions provider Porter.

In January 2016 Mahindra launched a sub-compact monocoque SUV called the KUV100. The KUV100 received a major refresh in the form of the KUV100 NXT launched in October 2017.

On 3 September 2018, Mahindra Marazzo the shark inspired vehicle was launched in collaboration with Mahindra Research Valley (MRV), MANA and Pininfarina in four variants.

In February 2019, Mahindra launched its XUV300, a sub-4m compact monocoque SUV. The XUV300 was found to be the safest vehicle made in India in an independent crash test conducted by GNCAP, earning it a 5-star adult safety rating along with India's first ‘Safer Choice’ Award.

In October 2020, Mahindra launched the second-generation Thar 2020 – the All-New Thar.

In 2021, Mahindra launched the XUV700.

In June 27, 2022 Mahindra released the Scorpio N, also called the "Big Daddy of SUVs." The previous generation will now be called, "Scorpio Classic."

Mahindra in North America
Mahindra planned to sell the diesel SUVs and pickup trucks starting in late 2010 in North America through an independent distributor, Global Vehicles USA, based in Alpharetta, Georgia. Mahindra announced it would import pickup trucks from India in knockdown kit (CKD) form to circumvent the Chicken tax. CKDs are complete vehicles that were assembled in the United States from kits of parts shipped in crates. On 18 October 2010, however, it was reported that Mahindra had indefinitely delayed the launch of vehicles into the North American market, citing legal issues between it and Global Vehicles after Mahindra retracted its contract with Global Vehicles earlier in 2010, due to a decision to sell the vehicles directly to consumers instead of through Global Vehicles. However, a November 2010 report quoted John Perez, the CEO of Global Vehicles USA, as estimating that he expected Mahindra's small Diesel pickups to go on sale in the United States by spring 2011, although legal complications remained, and Perez, while hopeful, admitted that arbitration could take more than a year. Later reports suggested that the delays may be due to Mahindra scrapping the original model of the truck and replacing it with an upgraded one before selling them to Americans. In June 2012, a mass tort lawsuit was filed against Mahindra by its American dealers, alleging the company of conspiracy and fraud. Mahindra Automotive North America (MANA), the company's U.S. subsidiary, opened a car manufacturing plant in Detroit, Michigan on 20 November 2017. The plant employs 250 people and is the first automotive production facility to open in Detroit in 25 years. The first product from the new facility was launched on 2 March 2018 as the Mahindra Roxor.

Military vehicles
The company has built and assembled military vehicles, commencing in 1947 with the importation of the Willys Jeep that had been widely used in World War II. Its line of military vehicles under Mahindra Emirates Vehicle Armouring (MEVA, Mahindra Armoured) include the Mahindra Armored Light Specialist Vehicle (ALSV) and the Mahindra Armored Straton Armoured Personnel Carrier (APC), and discontinued vehicles such as the Axe. It also maintained a joint venture with BAE Systems, Defence Land Systems India; one of the first vehicles made under this was the Mahindra Mine Protected Vehicle-I (MPV-I).

In 2018, the company signed a multi-million dollar aerospace deal with Airbus Group for the  manufacture and supply of metallic components.

Industrial gensets
Mahindra & Mahindra entered the energy sector in 2002, in response to growing demands for increased electric power in India, over 450,000 Mahindra Powerol engines and Diesel generator sets (gensets) have been installed in India.

In 2018, Mahindra Powerol announced its entry into gas powered genset with the launch of its first CNG/NG gensets.
Mahindra Powerol was awarded the Deming Prize in 2014.

Farm equipment

Mahindra began manufacturing tractors for the Indian market during the early '60s. It is the top tractor company in the world (by volume) with annual sales totaling more than 200,000 tractors. Since its inception, the company has sold over 2.1 million tractors. Mahindra & Mahindra's farm equipment division (Mahindra Tractors) has over 1,000 dealers servicing approx. 1.45 million customers.

Mahindra tractors are available in 40 countries, including India, the United States, China, Australia, New Zealand, Africa (Nigeria, Mali, Chad, Gambia, Angola, Sudan, Ghana, and Morocco), Latin America (Chile, Argentina, Brazil, Venezuela, Central America, and the Caribbean), South Asia (Sri Lanka, Bangladesh, and Nepal), the Middle East (Iran and Syria) and Eastern Europe (Serbia, Turkey, and Macedonia). Mahindra Tractors manufactures its products at four plants in India, two in Mainland China, three in the United States, and one in Australia. It has three major subsidiaries: Mahindra USA, Mahindra (China) Tractor Company, and Mahindra Yueda (Yancheng) Tractor Company (a joint venture with the Jiangsu Yueda Group).

In 2003, the Farm Equipment Sector of Mahindra & Mahindra won the Deming Application Prize. In 2007 it received the Japan Quality Medal for implementing Total Quality Management in its entire business operations. The company has garnered the highest customer satisfaction index (CSI) in the industry at 88 percent. It earned a 2008 Golden Peacock Award in the Innovative Product/Services category for its in-house development of a load car. In its 2009 survey of Asia's 200 most admired and innovative companies, the Wall Street Journal named Mahindra & Mahindra one of the 10 most innovative Indian companies.

In addition to tractors, Mahindra sells other farm equipment. It has expanded its product-line to include farm mechanisation products via Mahindra AppliTrac.

In 2017, Mahindra & Mahindra Ltd's Farm Equipment Sector (FES) launched 'JIVO' a small tractor platform in the sub 25HP category.

In 2020, the company launched the Sarpanch Plus range. This ranges between 30bhp and 50bhp, and has undergone a subtle improvement as compared to the Sarpanch 575 tractor which was launched earlier.
In 2020, Mahindra also launched new equipment for potato planting. PlantingMaster Potato + is designed in collaboration with Dewulf. On 2 October 2020, Mahindra rolled out Krish-e centers under its new ‘Farming as a Service’ business. This business vertical provides progressive, affordable and accessible tech-driven services to farmers.

In October 2021, Mahindra's FES launched a next-generation Yuvo tractor platform - a new-age advanced tractor range called the Yuvo Tech+.

Models

Current models

Discontinued models
 Mahindra Armada (1993-2001)
 Mahindra Voyager (1997-2002)
 Mahindra Xylo (2009-2019)
 Mahindra Maxximo (2010-2015)
 Mahindra XUV500 (2011-2021)
 Mahindra Quanto (2012-2016)
 Mahindra Nuvosport (2016-2020)
 Mahindra Verito Vibe (2013-2019)
 Mahindra e2o (2013-2016)
 Mahindra TUV 300 (2015-2020) Replacement of TUV 300 comes as Bolero Neo.
 Mahindra KUV100 (2016-2022)
 Mahindra Alturas G4 (2018-2022)

Factories

Naming of vehicles 
Most commercial and passenger vehicles made by the company follow the rule of ending with an 'O', like in Scorpio, Verito and XUV700. In 2013, the then president Pawan Goenka confirmed that this was after the success of Bolero and Scorpio, the company thought the ‘O’ at the end of the vehicle was lucky and it has become a tradition.

Awards and recognitions
Bombay Chamber Good Corporate Citizen Award for 2006–07.
Businessworld FICCI-SEDF Corporate Social Responsibility Award 2007.
The Brand Trust Report ranked M&M as India's 10th Most Trusted Brand in its India Study 2014 survey (from 20,000 brands analyzed).
The Farm Equipment division received the Deming Prize in 2003.
The Farm Equipment division received the Japan Quality Medal in 2007.
The US based Reputation Institute ranked M&M amongst the top Ten Indian companies in its 'Global 200: The World's Best Corporate Reputations' list for 2008.
Bluebytes News rated M&M as India's second Most Reputed Car Company (reported in their study titled Reputation Benchmark Study) conducted for the Auto (Cars) Sector in 2012.
Mahindra won top Corporate Governance and CSR awards at Asiamoney Awards 2016.
Mahindra was named ‘Manufacturing Innovator of the Year’ by TIME India Awards in 2017.
The company became the first Carbon Neutral plant facility in 2018.
In 2018, seven automotive plants of Mahindra & Mahindra (M&M) bagged the prestigious Japan Institute of Plant Maintenance (JIPM) award.
Mahindra was named India's Best Brand by Interbrand in 2019.
Mahindra & Mahindra was among 2000 largest companies of the world in the Forbes 2000 list.
The company was 23rd on Fortune's global ‘Change The World’ list 2019.
Mahindra Automotive was recognised as ‘One of the Most Trusted Brands of India 2021’ by Team Marksmen and CNBC TV18.

See also
 Automotive industry in India
 List of companies of India
 Mahindra Lifespaces
 Mahindra Racing
 Mahindra Susten
 Mahindra Two Wheelers
 Mahindra & Mahindra Financial Services Limited
 Mahindra Truck and Bus Division

References

External links

 

Mahindra Group
Electric vehicle manufacturers of India
Car manufacturers of India
Military vehicle manufacturers
Manufacturing companies based in Mumbai
Vehicle manufacturing companies established in 1945
Indian companies established in 1945
BSE SENSEX
NIFTY 50
Truck manufacturers of India
Car brands
Companies listed on the National Stock Exchange of India
Companies listed on the Bombay Stock Exchange
Companies of India